Sididedda Sahodara is a 1983 Indian Kannada-language film, directed by Joe Simon and produced by B. P. Baliga, B. S. Baliga and B. M. Baliga. The film stars Vishnuvardhan, Tiger Prabhakar, Aarathi and Jayamala. The film has musical score by Chellapilla Satyam. The songs were also popular.

Cast

Vishnuvardhan
Tiger Prabhakar
Aarathi
Jayamala
M. Leelavathi
Dinesh
Musuri Krishnamurthy
Dheerendra Gopal
Sudheer
Chethan Ramarao in Guest Appearance
Sadashiva Brahmavar in Guest Appearance
K. V. Manjaiah in Guest Appearance
Kulashekar in Guest Appearance
Comedian Guggu
Lakshman
Thippeswamy
G. Chandrashekar
Munikumar
Gabbur
Nataraja
Anil Jain
Mahalinga
Balaraj
Master Sanjay
Master Narendra
Shanthamma
Girija
Manjula
Kamala
Vimala

Soundtrack
The music was composed by Satyam.

References

External links
 
 

1983 films
1980s Kannada-language films
Films scored by Satyam (composer)